Martin David Foster (September 3, 1861 – October 20, 1919) was a U.S. Representative from Illinois.

Born near West Salem, Illinois, Foster attended the public schools and Eureka College (Illinois). He was graduated from the Eclectic Medical Institute, Cincinnati, Ohio, in 1882 and from the Hahnemann Medical College, Chicago, Illinois, in 1884. He commenced the practice of medicine in Olney, Illinois, in 1884. He served as a member of a board of United States examining surgeons in 1885–1889, and again from 1893 to 1897. He served as mayor of Olney, Illinois, in 1895 and 1902.

Foster was elected as a Democrat to the Sixtieth and to the five succeeding Congresses (March 4, 1907 – March 3, 1919). He served as chairman of the Committee on Mines and Mining (Sixty-second through Sixty-fifth Congresses). He was an unsuccessful candidate for reelection in 1918. He engaged in the practice of medicine until his death in Olney, Illinois, October 20, 1919. He was interred in Haven Hill Cemetery.

References

1861 births
1919 deaths
Eureka College alumni
Mayors of places in Illinois
People from Edwards County, Illinois
People from Olney, Illinois
Democratic Party members of the United States House of Representatives from Illinois
19th-century American politicians